In chemistry, a superoxide is a compound that contains the superoxide ion, which has the chemical formula . The systematic name of the anion is dioxide(1−). The reactive oxygen ion superoxide is particularly important as the product of the one-electron reduction of dioxygen , which occurs widely in nature.  Molecular oxygen (dioxygen) is a diradical containing two unpaired electrons, and superoxide results from the addition of an electron which fills one of the two degenerate molecular orbitals, leaving a charged ionic species with a single unpaired electron and a net negative charge of −1.  Both dioxygen and the superoxide anion are free radicals that exhibit paramagnetism. Superoxide was historically also known as "hyperoxide".

Salts

Superoxide forms salts with alkali metals and alkaline earth metals.

Upon dissolution of these salts in water, however, the dissolved  undergoes disproportionation (dismutation) extremely rapidly (in a pH-dependent manner):

2 O2- + H2O -> 3/2 O2 + 2 OH-

This reaction (with moisture and carbon dioxide in exhaled air) is the basis of the use of potassium superoxide as an oxygen source in chemical oxygen generators, such as those used on the Space Shuttle and on submarines. Superoxides are also used in firefighters' oxygen tanks to provide a readily available source of oxygen. In this process,  acts as a Brønsted base, initially forming the hydroperoxyl radical.

The superoxide anion, and its protonated form, hydroperoxyl, are in equilibrium in an aqueous solution:
O2- + H2O <=> HO2 + OH-

Given that the hydroperoxyl radical has a pKa of around 4.8, superoxide predominantly exists in the anionic form at neutral pH.

Potassium superoxide is soluble in dimethyl sulfoxide (facilitated by crown ethers) and is stable as long as protons are not available. Superoxide can also be generated in aprotic solvents by cyclic voltammetry.

Superoxide salts also decompose in the solid state, but this process requires heating:

2 NaO2  -> Na2O2  +  O2

Biology
Superoxide and hydroperoxyl are often discussed interchangeably, although superoxide predominates at physiological pHs. Both superoxide and hydroperoxyl are classified as reactive oxygen species. It is generated by the immune system to kill invading microorganisms. In phagocytes, superoxide is produced in large quantities by the enzyme NADPH oxidase for use in oxygen-dependent killing mechanisms of invading pathogens. Mutations in the gene coding for the NADPH oxidase cause an immunodeficiency syndrome called chronic granulomatous disease, characterized by extreme susceptibility to infection, especially catalase-positive organisms. In turn, micro-organisms genetically engineered to lack the superoxide-scavenging enzyme superoxide dismutase (SOD) lose virulence. Superoxide is also deleterious when produced as a byproduct of mitochondrial respiration (most notably by Complex I and Complex III), as well as several other enzymes, for example xanthine oxidase, which can catalyze the transfer of electrons directly to molecular oxygen under strongly reducing conditions.

Because superoxide is toxic at high concentrations, nearly all organisms living in the presence of oxygen express SOD. SOD efficiently catalyzes the disproportionation of superoxide:
2 HO2  ->  O2  +  H2O2
Other proteins that can be both oxidized and reduced by superoxide (such as hemoglobin) have weak SOD-like activity. Genetic inactivation ("knockout") of SOD produces deleterious phenotypes in organisms ranging from bacteria to mice and have provided important clues as to the mechanisms of toxicity of superoxide in vivo.

Yeast lacking both mitochondrial and cytosolic SOD grow very poorly in air, but quite well under anaerobic conditions. Absence of cytosolic SOD causes a dramatic increase in mutagenesis and genomic instability. Mice lacking mitochondrial SOD (MnSOD) die around 21 days after birth due to neurodegeneration, cardiomyopathy, and lactic acidosis. Mice lacking cytosolic SOD (CuZnSOD) are viable but suffer from multiple pathologies, including reduced lifespan, liver cancer, muscle atrophy, cataracts, thymic involution, haemolytic anemia, and a very rapid age-dependent decline in female fertility.

Superoxide may contribute to the pathogenesis of many diseases (the evidence is particularly strong for radiation poisoning and hyperoxic injury), and perhaps also to aging via the oxidative damage that it inflicts on cells. While the action of superoxide in the pathogenesis of some conditions is strong (for instance, mice and rats overexpressing CuZnSOD or MnSOD are more resistant to strokes and heart attacks), the role of superoxide in aging must be regarded as unproven, for now. In model organisms (yeast, the fruit fly Drosophila, and mice), genetically knocking out CuZnSOD shortens lifespan and accelerates certain features of aging: (cataracts, muscle atrophy, macular degeneration, and thymic involution). But the converse, increasing the levels of CuZnSOD, does not seem to consistently increase lifespan (except perhaps in Drosophila). The most widely accepted view is that oxidative damage (resulting from multiple causes, including superoxide) is but one of several factors limiting lifespan.

Assay in biological systems
The assay of superoxide generated in biological systems is a difficult task because of its high reactivity and short half-life. One approach that has been used in quantitative assays converts superoxide to hydrogen peroxide, which is relatively stable. Hydrogen peroxide is then assayed by a fluorimetric method. As a free radical, superoxide has a strong EPR signal, and it is possible to detect superoxide directly using this method when it is abundant enough. For practical purposes, this can be achieved only in vitro under non-physiological conditions, such as high pH (which slows the spontaneous dismutation) with the enzyme xanthine oxidase. Researchers have developed a series of tool compounds termed "spin traps" that can react with superoxide, forming a meta-stable radical (half-life 1–15 minutes), which can be more readily detected by EPR. Superoxide spin-trapping was initially carried out with DMPO, but phosphorus derivatives with improved half-lives, such as DEPPMPO and DIPPMPO, have become more widely used.

Bonding and structure
Superoxides are compounds in which the oxidation number of oxygen is −. Whereas molecular oxygen (dioxygen) is a diradical containing two unpaired electrons, the addition of a second electron fills one of its two degenerate molecular orbitals, leaving a charged ionic species with single unpaired electron and a net negative charge of −1.  Both dioxygen and the superoxide anion are free radicals that exhibit paramagnetism.

The derivatives of dioxygen have characteristic O–O distances that correlate with the order of the O–O bond.

See also
 Oxygen, O2
 Ozonide, 
 Peroxide, 
 Oxide, O2−
 Dioxygenyl, 
Antimycin A – used in fishery management, this compound produces large quantities of this free radical.
Paraquat – used as a herbicide, this compound produces large quantities of this free radical.
 Xanthine oxidase – This form of the enzyme xanthine dehydrogenase produces large amounts of superoxide.

References

Anions
Oxygen compounds
Oxyanions
Immune system
 
Free radicals
Reactive oxygen species